Sawaal (translation: Question) is a Hindi drama film produced by Yash Chopra and directed by Ramesh Talwar, released in 1982.  The music was composed by Khayyam and the lyrics were written by Majrooh Sultanpuri.  Despite an all-star cast, it did not succeed at the box office.

Plot 
Seth Dhanpat Rai Mehta (Sanjeev Kumar) is the country's most powerful smuggler who is surrounded by his fortress of power and money. His daughter Sonia (Poonam Dhillon) falls in love with Ravi Malhotra (Shashi Kapoor), a police officer and wants to marry him. Dhanpat Rai very soon realizes that his son Vikram (Randhir Kapoor) has also taken a path that goes against the one he travels. Vikram has been engaged to a pretty but poor girl Reshmi (Swaroop Sampat). Now the question begins to haunt Seth Dhanpat Rai - "What is more important: His children's happiness or what he is, i.e. power and money?" Dhanpat Rai's question is answered soon.

Cast
Sanjeev Kumar as Dhanpat Rai Mehta
Waheeda Rehman as Anju Mehta
Shashi Kapoor as Inspector Ravi Malhotra
Poonam Dhillon as Sonia Mehta
Randhir Kapoor as Vikram Mehta "Vicky"
Swaroop Sampat as Reshmi Singh
Prem Chopra as Shamsher Singh
Madan Puri as Govindram
Manmohan Krishna as Lala Dinanath Malhotra  
Jagdish Raj as Inspector Jagdish
Mac Mohan as Mac
Yunus Parvez as Yunus
Vikas Anand as Vikas Anand
Avtar Gill as Lal Singh
Anjan Srivastav as Dinanath's Boss
Helen as Cabaret Dancer
Kalpana Iyer as Cabaret Dancer
Padma Khanna as Courtesan
 Kamal Kapoor
 Gautam Sarin as sniper killer

Crew
Director – Ramesh Talwar
Story – Surinder Prakash
Screenplay – Sagar Sarhadi
Producer – Yash Chopra
Production Company – Yash Raj Films
Editor – B. Mangeshkar
Cinematographer – Kay Gee
Art Director – Studio Diwakar, Sudhendu Roy
Costume Designer – Akbar Gabbana, Allan Gill, Bhanu Athaiya, Jennifer Kapoor, Kuki Malhotra, Mani Rabadi, Pamela Chopra
Choreographer – Gopi Krishna, Oscar, Suresh Bhatt, Vijay
Music Director – Khayyam
Lyricist – Majrooh Sultanpuri
Playback Singers – Anwar, Asha Bhosle, Jagjit Kaur, Kishore Kumar, Lata Mangeshkar, Nitin Mukesh, Pamela Chopra, Bhupinder Singh

Soundtrack

References

External links 
 
Sawaal film on Gomolo

1982 drama films
1982 films
1980s Hindi-language films
Yash Raj Films films
Films scored by Khayyam
Films directed by Ramesh Talwar